The 1982–83 Atlanta Hawks season was the franchise's thirty-fourth season in the National Basketball Association and fifteenth in Atlanta, Georgia. Prior to the start of the season, the Hawks made a blockbuster trade. The franchise sent John Drew and Freeman Williams to the Utah Jazz in exchange for first round draft pick Dominique Wilkins, a star at the University of Georgia. Wilkins would make an impact as he averaged 17.5 points per game. The Hawks finished in second place with a 43–39 record. In the playoffs, the Hawks would however be eliminated 2–1 by the Boston Celtics.

Draft picks

Roster

Regular season

Season standings

z - clinched division title
y - clinched division title
x - clinched playoff spot

Record vs. opponents

Game log

|-
| || || || || ||
|-

|-
| || || || || ||
|-

|-
| || || || || ||
|-

|-
| || || || || ||
|-

|-
| || || || || ||
|-

|-
| || || || || ||
|-

Playoffs

|- align="center" bgcolor="#ffcccc"
| 1
| April 19
| @ Boston
| L 95–103
| Dan Roundfield (24)
| Dan Roundfield (20)
| Johnny Davis (11)
| Boston Garden15,320
| 0–1
|- align="center" bgcolor="#ccffcc"
| 2
| April 22
| Boston
| W 95–93
| Dan Roundfield (19)
| Tree Rollins (14)
| Johnny Davis (14)
| Omni Coliseum10,405
| 1–1
|- align="center" bgcolor="#ffcccc"
| 3
| April 24
| @ Boston
| L 79–98
| Tree Rollins (18)
| Dan Roundfield (10)
| three players tied (3)
| Boston Garden15,320
| 1–2
|-

Player statistics

Season

Playoffs

Player Statistics Citation:

Awards and records

Awards
 Dan Roundfield, NBA All-Defensive First Team
 Wayne Rollins, NBA All-Defensive Second Team
 Dominique Wilkins, NBA All-Rookie Team 1st Team

Records

Transactions

Trades

Free Agents

Additions

Subtractions

See also
 1982-83 NBA season

References

Atlanta Hawks seasons
A
Atlanta Haw
Atlanta Haw